Abhishek Gupta can refer to:

 Abhishek Gupta (television personality) (born 1978), Indian television personality
 Abhishek Gupta (cricketer) (born 1990), Indian cricketer